Eric Stenback is a paralympic athlete from the United States competing mainly in category C6 sprint events.

Eric competed in three Paralympic games, across a wide variety of track and field events winning a total of three medals.  His first games in 1988 Summer Paralympics saw him compete in the 100m finishing sixth, 400m also finishing sixth, 3000m cross country finishing last in eighth and finishing fourth in the long jump.  In the 1992 Summer Paralympics Eric concentrated in the sprints, winning bronze in the 100m, silver in the 200m and bronze in the 400m. His last games were in 1996 were Eric finished eighth in the 100m, failed to reach the final of the 400m and finished eleventh in the discus.

References

External links
 

Paralympic track and field athletes of the United States
Athletes (track and field) at the 1988 Summer Paralympics
Athletes (track and field) at the 1992 Summer Paralympics
Athletes (track and field) at the 1996 Summer Paralympics
Paralympic silver medalists for the United States
Paralympic bronze medalists for the United States
American male sprinters
American male long-distance runners
American male discus throwers
American male long jumpers
Living people
Year of birth missing (living people)
Medalists at the 1992 Summer Paralympics
Paralympic medalists in athletics (track and field)